The 18-50mm 2.8-4.5 DC OS HSM is a wide-angle zoom lens produced by Sigma Corporation. The lens has four different variates, fitting on the Canon EF mount, Pentax K mount, Minolta A-mount, and the Nikon F-mount. It features internal focusing and internal zooming, as well as two SLD elements and three aspherical lenses.

See also
List of Nikon compatible lenses with integrated autofocus-motor

References

External links

018-050mm f 2.8-4.5 DC OS HSM